Franz König (born 1927) is an Austrian coxswain.

König competed at the 1956 European Rowing Championships in Bled with Alfred Sageder and Josef Kloimstein in the coxed pair where they won a bronze medal. They then competed at the 1956 Summer Olympics in Melbourne in the same boat class where they were eliminated in the semi-final.

References

External links
 

1927 births
Possibly living people
Austrian male rowers
Olympic rowers of Austria
Rowers at the 1956 Summer Olympics
Coxswains (rowing)
European Rowing Championships medalists